Speed Kings is a 1915 American silent comedy film featuring Oliver Hardy.

Cast
 Bobby Burns - Pokes
 Walter Stull - Jabbs
 Billy Ruge	
 Ethel Marie Burton	
 Oliver Hardy - (as Babe Hardy)
 Frank Hanson	
 Edna Reynolds

See also
 List of American films of 1915
 Oliver Hardy filmography

External links

1915 films
American silent short films
American black-and-white films
1915 comedy films
1915 short films
Silent American comedy films
American comedy short films
1910s American films